Gaelle Adisson (born 1974) is an American deep house and downtempo singer-songwriter/producer born in New Jersey.

Life style
Adisson contributed vocals on the 1999 global hit "King of My Castle", a song by the Wamdue Project. "King of My Castle" peaked at the top of the UK Singles Chart and UK Dance Chart in November 1999. It also made the top ten in Denmark, France, and Germany.

In 2004, Gaelle released her debut album, Transient through the label Naked Music. Her style is known for its smooth signature.

Influences
Born to Haitian parents, Adisson has created a cultural hybrid that has influenced her music.
The following artists have also influenced her: Patti LaBelle, Radiohead, Portishead, Cocteau Twins, Peter Gabriel, Sting, Sade, Björk, Duran Duran, Prince, Hugh Masekela, Julio Iglesias, Nina Simone, Trevor Horn, Trent Reznor and Donna Summer.

Discography

Albums
 2004 Transient

Other works
1997 "King of My Castle" – Single
1999 "Cascades of Colour" – Single
2002 "Mercy Street" – Single
2007 "Give It Back" – Maxi Single

References

External links
Gaelle on SoundCloud (unreleased songs)
Gaelle on Myspace
Gaelle on discogs.com
Creative Loafing article about Gaelle and her album Transient

20th-century American women singers
20th-century American singers
21st-century American women singers
21st-century American singers
1974 births
African-American women singer-songwriters
American contemporary R&B singers
American contraltos
American dance musicians
American electronic musicians
American house musicians
American musicians of Haitian descent
American soul singers
American women in electronic music
Deep house musicians
Downtempo musicians
Living people
Singer-songwriters from New Jersey
20th-century African-American women singers
21st-century African-American women singers